Mahdi Andulla Saad (born 15 March 1989) is a Bahraini handball player for Al-Najma and the Bahraini national team.

He participated at the 2017 World Men's Handball Championship.

References

1989 births
Living people
Bahraini male handball players
Expatriate handball players
Bahraini expatriate sportspeople in Saudi Arabia
Olympic handball players of Bahrain
Handball players at the 2020 Summer Olympics